Turcozonites is a genus of gastropods belonging to the family Zonitidae.

The species of this genus are found in Eastern Mediterranean.

Species:

Turcozonites anamurensis 
Turcozonites corax 
Turcozonites insignis 
Turcozonites megistus 
Turcozonites piratarum 
Turcozonites silifkeensis 
Turcozonites wandae

References

 Riedel, A. (1987). Revision der Gattung Zonites Montfort (Gastropoda, Zonitidae): türkische Arten. Nebst Ergänzungen und Verzeichnis aller Zonites-Arten. Annales Zoologici, 41 (1): 1-42, pl. 1-9. Warszawa 
 Bank, R. A. (2017). Classification of the Recent terrestrial Gastropoda of the World. Last update: July 16th, 2017

Zonitidae